Sarvandan or Sorvandan may refer to:
 Sarvandan, Fars
 Sarvandan, Gilan